The Sunbeam-Talbot 80 is a 4-door 4-light sports saloon which was produced by English manufacturer Sunbeam-Talbot from 1948 to 1950.

The 80 was introduced in July 1948 as an entirely new body for the Sunbeam-Talbot Ten. As before sports saloon and drophead coupé bodies were offered. It was fitted with an overhead valve revision of the Minx / Ten's 1,185 cc four cylinder engine developing  at 4800 rpm. The new cast-iron cylinder head with its overhead valves shared just its design with the 2 Litre 90, the cylinder blocks were not the same. From the Ten to the 80 the carburettor switched sides.

All other dimensions were shared with the 90.

The 80 was discontinued in September 1950 with 3,500 examples having been produced.

References

80
Cars introduced in 1948
Sedans
Convertibles